Being Mick is a 2001 documentary television film which chronicles the life of Mick Jagger for one year. Much of the film was shot by Jagger himself using a handheld camera. The film documents his recording of the Goddess in the Doorway album, as well as daily life including his family and friends. In the film, Mick attends a charity fundraiser hosted by Elton John as well as the premiere of the Kate Winslet film Enigma, which Jagger's company produced.

The film was directed by Kevin Macdonald and Jim Gable and produced by Victoria Pearman. Following its television debut on ABC on Thanksgiving night 2001, the film was released on DVD on 21 May 2002 through Lionsgate Home Entertainment.

Cast
 Mick Jagger as Himself
 Bono as Himself
 Bob Geldof as Himself 
 Hugh Grant as Himself 
 Jerry Hall as Herself 
 George Hickenlooper as Himself 
 Elizabeth Jagger as Herself 
 Gabriel Jagger as Himself 
 Georgia Jagger as Herself 
 Jade Jagger as Herself 
 Wyclef Jean as Himself 
 Elton John as Himself 
 Lenny Kravitz as Himself 
 Keith Richards as Himself 
 Dougray Scott as Himself
 Sting as Himself 
 James Threapleton as Himself 
 Pete Townshend as Himself 
 Kate Winslet as Herself 
 Ron Wood as Himself 
 Bill Wyman as Himself

References

External links
 

2001 television films
2001 films
British documentary films
British television films
Documentary films about singers
Films directed by Kevin Macdonald (director)
Mick Jagger
2000s musical films
2001 documentary films
2000s English-language films
2000s British films